Muddy York RFC is Toronto's Inclusive rugby team and Canada's second Inclusive rugby team. The team was founded by Dave Galbraith in 2003, and is part of the TRU and IGR organizations.  Muddy York RFC is Toronto's first amateur gay team.

Name and Coat of Arms
"Toronto Muddy York " is a tribute to the original name of Toronto. The team colors – blue and yellow – come from both the City of Toronto’s coat of arms and the Rugby School in Warwickshire, where the game was created in 1823. Blue symbolizes tradition, loyalty, unity, and strength; while yellow symbolizes success, athletic achievements, and joy.

Competitions
Muddy has held an inaugural tournament called the Dirty Rugger Tournament, which houses the Beaver Bowl cup since 2009. They have played in the Bi-Yearly Bingham cup since New York in 2006 every time

Outside of Rugby
The Gay Who Wasn't Gay Enough is a Youtube video that has surpassed 500k views.
Muddy York was involved in a photo series called Boys will be Boys by Giovanni Capriotti. It won first in sports at the 2017 World Press Photo of the Year awards and the series was displayed at Bingham 2018 Amsterdam. Will featured be on an episode of the upcoming season of 1 queen 5 queers.

Club Presidents and Commissioners 

 2003  -  Dave Galbraith
 2004  -  Marc Charrier
 2005-2006  -  Mike Cole
 2007  -  Oliver S
 2008-2009  -  Brandon Taylor
 2010-2013  -  James McCabe
 2014-2016  -  John Jeffries
 2017-2018  -  Omar Aljebouri
 2019  -  Neil Littlejohns
 2020-2021  -  Ian Royer
 2022  -  Quinton Leduc

Notes and references

External links

Youtube Channel
Twitter https://twitter.com/muddyyorkrfc

Canadian rugby union teams
International Gay Rugby member clubs
LGBT sports organizations in Canada
Rugby union teams in Ontario
Sports teams in Toronto